Rivka Galchen (born April 19, 1976) is a Canadian-American writer. Her first novel, Atmospheric Disturbances, was published in 2008 and was awarded the William Saroyan International Prize for Writing. She is the author of five books and a contributor of journalism and essays to The New Yorker magazine.

Early life
Galchen was born in Toronto, Ontario, to Israeli academics. When she was in preschool, her parents relocated to the United States. She grew up in Norman, Oklahoma, where her father, Tzvi Gal-chen, was a professor of meteorology at the University of Oklahoma and her mother was a computer programmer at the National Severe Storms Laboratory.

Education
Galchen received her M.D. from Mount Sinai in 2003. After medical school, she earned a MFA in 2006 from Columbia University, where she was a Robert Bingham fellow.

Career
In 2006, Galchen received the Rona Jaffe Foundation Writers' Award for women writers.

Her first novel, Atmospheric Disturbances, was published in May 2008. The novel was a finalist for the Mercantile Library's 2008 John Sargent, Sr., First Novel Prize, the Canadian Writers' Trust's 2008 Fiction Prize, and the 2008 Governor General's Award.

Galchen teaches writing at Columbia University. In 2010, The New Yorker chose her as one of its "20 Under 40".

Galchen served as the Mary Ellen von der Heyden Fiction Fellow for the Spring 2011 term at the American Academy in Berlin. In 2015, she received a Guggenheim Fellowship.

Galchen's short-story collection American Innovations was published in 2014. It was longlisted for the 2014 Scotiabank Giller Prize and received the Danuta Gleed Literary Award. Each story is based on a well-known short story by another author, but switches the narrator from male to female and changes other elements.

In 2016, Galchen published Little Labors, a book of essays about motherhood.

In 2021, Galchen published her second novel, Everyone Knows Your Mother is a Witch. The novel was shortlisted for the 2021 Atwood Gibson Writers' Trust Fiction Prize.

Galchen writes for several national magazines, including The New Yorker, Harper's Magazine, and the New York Times Magazine. She contributes criticism and essays to The London Review of Books.

Bibliography

Novels
 
 
For children

Short fiction
Collections
 
Short stories

2023
How I became a Vet
New Yorker 3/13/2023

Nonfiction
 "My Mother, Myself". The New York Times, 2007.
 "Dream Machine: The Mind-Expanding World of Quantum Computing". The New Yorker, 2011.
 "From the pencil zone: Robert Walser's masterworklets". Harper's Magazine, 2010. 
 "Borges on Pleasure Island" (2010), essay in the New York Times
 "Disaster Aversion: The Quest to Control Hurricanes". Harper's Magazine, 2009. 
 "Case Notes of a Medical Student". Triple Canopy.
 "The Future of Paper". This Land, 2011.
 
 
 The Melancholy Mystery of Lullabies: On the bonds made between parents and children during a nightly ritual. New York Times Magazine, 2015
 
 
 "The Only Thing I Envy Men" The New Yorker, 2016.
 
 "Living in New York’s Unloved Neighborhood". The New Yorker'', 2021.

References

External links

Interviews 

 Interview of Galchen at The Fabulist
 Interview of Galchen at The Paris Review

Reviews
 New York Times review of Atmospheric Disturbances
  Salon review of Atmospheric Disturbances
  James Wood review in "The New Yorker"
  "New York Times" review of "American Innovations"
 "Globe and Mail" review of "American Innovations"

Author page
 https://arts.columbia.edu/profiles/rivka-galchen/

1976 births
Living people
21st-century American novelists
21st-century Canadian novelists
21st-century Canadian short story writers
21st-century Canadian women writers
American women novelists
Canadian expatriate writers in the United States
Canadian people of Israeli descent
Canadian women novelists
Canadian women short story writers
Columbia University School of the Arts alumni
Columbia University faculty
Harper's Magazine people
Jewish American novelists
Jewish Canadian writers
The New Yorker people
Rona Jaffe Foundation Writers' Award winners
Writers from Toronto
21st-century American women writers
21st-century American Jews